Idrottsbladet (Swedish: The Sports Gazette) was a Swedish sports magazine which existed between 1910 and 2009 in Stockholm, Sweden. During its lifetime it was the largest sports magazine in Scandinavia.

History and profile
Idrottsbladet was launched in 1910. It was headquartered in Stockholm. Torsten Tegnér was the owner and editor from 1915 to 1957 and continued as editor until 1967. After Tegnér's editorship the magazine began to focus on motorsport and was for some years a member of the Swedish Motorcycle and Snowmobile Association. One of the contributors of the magazine was Carl Linde.

In the 1950s Idrottsbladet was published three times per week. The magazine changed its name to Svensk Motorsport in 2008 and folded in 2009.

References

1910 establishments in Sweden
2009 disestablishments in Sweden
Bi-monthly magazines published in Sweden
Defunct magazines published in Sweden
Magazines established in 1910
Magazines disestablished in 2009
Magazines published in Stockholm
Sports magazines
Swedish-language magazines